The Grammy Award for Best Gospel Performance/Song is category at the annual Grammy Awards. It was first awarded in 2015. It combines two previously separate categories in the Gospel/Contemporary Christian Music field, Best Gospel Song (for songwriters) and Best Gospel/Contemporary Christian Music Performance (for performers). The current category recognizes both songwriters and performers (solo/duos/groups/collaborations/etc.) and is open for singles or tracks only. Songwriters are only awarded a Grammy Award if it is a newly written song. Grammys for cover versions of previously recorded songs are awarded to the performer(s) only.

These changes were made in June 2014 by NARAS "in the interest of clarifying the criteria, representing the current culture and creative DNA of the gospel and Contemporary Christian Music communities, and better reflecting the diversity and authenticity of today's gospel music industry."

Along with its sister category Best Contemporary Christian Music Performance/Song, both are the only Grammy categories that award both performers and songwriters.

According to the Grammy committee, the move recognizes "the critical contribution of both songwriters and performers by combining  songwriters and artists into the Best Gospel Performance/Song and Best Contemporary Christian Music Performance/Song categories."

Contemporary Christian Music performances, which were previously recognized in the Best Gospel/Contemporary Christian Music Performance category, now fall under the Best Contemporary Christian Music Performance/Song category only.

Recipients

See also
Grammy Award for Best Gospel Song
Grammy Award for Best Contemporary Christian Music Song
Grammy Award for Best Contemporary Christian Music Performance/Song

References

External links
 Official site

2015 establishments in the United States
Awards established in 2015
Gospel
Songwriting awards